Watan is a weekly Arab-American newspaper published by Watan News LLC. It was founded in Washington, D.C. in 1990 by journalist Nezam Mahdawi. In 1993, the newspaper moved its headquarters to Los Angeles, California.

Watan News started as a monthly newspaper, then became a weekly printed newspaper. It launched its news website in 1996.

History
Watan was originally launched as a monthly print publication in Washington in 1991 by Nazem Mahdawi. It shifted its headquarter to California in 1996.

Watan newspaper was started as a monthly, then every two weeks, and then weekly.

References

External links
 Official site

Arabic-language websites
Newspapers published in Washington, D.C.
American news websites
1990 establishments in the United States